Fizi is a territory in the south of Sud-Kivu Province, Democratic Republic of the Congo, bordering the South Kivu territories of Uvira, Mwenga and Shabunda to the north, Lake Tanganyika or Tanzania in the east, and the provinces Katanga in the south and Maniema in the west.

The predominant language in the territory is Bembe language (Ibembe) and Kiswahili.

Geography 
The Fizi territory is located in the south of the South kivu province, on the shore of Lake Tanganyika, borderline with Tanzania's  Kigoma Region.

Administrative division 
Collectivities within the Fizi territory include 
 N'Gangya 
 Lùlenge
 M'tambala
 Tangani'a
 Itombwe

Towns 

The capital city (chef-lieu) of the Fizi territory is called Fizi Centre, but Baraka(bala'a) is considered the main town of the territory because of its semi-urbanized advancements. Baraka is composed of three municipalities (Baraka, Katanga and Kalundja). In 1892, it became the first entity in the urban model in the province of South Kivu.

Some villages of Fizi are: Makobola, Kahama, Aseeci, Kwa Munene, Ilakala, Swema, Ake I, Ake II, Abeka, Mukwezi, Musenya, Atongo, Abûmbe, Ilela, Mgûle, Abondoki, 'wa Mboko, Lûûkyû, Mkangyaolo, 'wa Núndú, Bashiwaenge, Bashimweci, 'Yonwe, Zimbwe, Lusambo, Atûngulû, Atondo, Losenda, Lulinda, Elemyonga, Mkolwe, Bûkû, Bitobolo, Lûbûmba, Atete, Lweba, Andale, Ekwena, Abela, Alûnja, Lo'oe, Matongo, Mwemezi, Bomani (Baraka centre), Ebonjwa, Mwansombo, Mwambango, Mongemonge, Mwatembo, Akyûngwe, Akomba, Atanga. Upon reaching Atanga, there is a junction, at which turning left leads to Fizi and the open side of the Lake Tanganyika shore. Malinde is a junction village. Towns after turning left include Malinde, Mlongwe, Atalûkûlû, Isee, Sebele. There is another junction in Sebele village. The right road leads to Eonde and then Kazimia village.
The left road heads to Nemba, Msombozi, Kisokwe, Manga, Rasi, Mizimu, Kalongwe, Dine, Ibwe la nyookye, Kahongo, Equateur, Bandundu, Bas Zaire, Lubomo, Lwambama, Mwayenga, Kalila, Bwenge, Lubilo, Hona, Mwajalûlû, Bûma, Alamba, Kilumû, Kazimia.

There is no road access between Nemba to Kazimia; people use boats for transportation because most villages are built on shore and between mountains. Kazimia, Abumbwe, Nguma, Ekyoci, Lûandaki, Atuma, Ebamba, Ehingeci, Asaba, Msamba, Yungu, Esanu, Sele, Akone, Mkongwe, Mande, Talama and the river Alela is the border of Fizi and Shaba or Sud-Kivu province and Shaba Province. If you jump the mountains of Fizi, you will find several villages there : Maganja, Bibokoboko, Minembwe, kanguli,,wangulube, mkera, The main mining city of Fizi is Misèsè and Mkera

History 
The region has a long history of independence from Kinshasa. It was the location of the maquis set up by Laurent-Désiré Kabila in 1967, as well as the place where Laurent-Désiré Kabila raised his son, the former president Joseph Kabila, in 1973. Throughout much of the Second Congo War, the town was contested by numerous armed groups.
Provincial MP representative are :Alimasi Malumbe.
Abungulu mateso.
Shenila Mwanza.
Malick job bumbu.
Prince 

National Member of parliament representing Fizi in Kinshasa are:
Msambya Abwe Freddy.
Ambatobe Nyongolo Ammy.
Nehemie Wilondja Nwilanya.

Politics 
The Fizi territory is represented in the National Assembly by three deputies:
Amy Ambatobe Nyomholo P.P.R.DCongo)|
Msambya Abwe Fredy
Nehemy Wilondja Mwilanya

Notes and references

External links 

 Territoire de Fizi-Itombwe ou le pays de Babembe, fizi-itombwe.com 
 Rapport de l'Atelier de Réflexion sur les Resources Locales et la Dynamique du Développement Rural dans le Territoire de Fizi - Itombwe, report of seminar held 19–21 February 2006 

Territories of South Kivu Province